Live at Sturgis is a live album by the southern rock band 38 Special, released in 1999. It was recorded at the Buffalo Chip Campground in Sturgis, South Dakota, on August 12, 1999, during the Sturgis Motorcycle Rally except for the last track, which is a new studio recording from the same year.

Track listing
"Rockin' into the Night" (Jim Peterik, Gary Smith, Frankie Sullivan) – 4:53
"Twentieth Century Fox" (Don Barnes, Jeff Carlisi, Larry Steele, Donnie Van Zant) – 4:01
"Back Where You Belong" (Gary O'Connor) – 4:31
"Wild-Eyed Southern Boys" (Peterik) – 5:38
"Fade to Blue" (Barnes, Danny Chauncey, Peterik) – 4:41
"If I'd Been the One" (Barnes, Carlisi, Steele, Van Zant) – 4:08
"Rebel to Rebel" (Carlisi, Peterik, Van Zant) – 7:01
"Take 'Em Out" (Barnes, Carlisi, Steele, Van Zant) – 4:17
"Déjà Voodoo" (Barnes, Carlisi, Robert White Johnson, Peterik, Van Zant) – 6:31
"Fantasy Girl" (Carlisi, Peterik) – 4:16
"Caught Up in You" (Barnes, Carlisi, Peterik) – 6:23
"Hold On Loosely" (Barnes, Carlisi, Peterik) – 5:54
"Just One Girl" (Barnes, Chauncey, Peterik) – 4:36

Personnel
retrieved from liner notes images
Don Barnes - guitar, vocals
Bobby Capps - keyboards, vocals
Danny Chauncey - guitar, vocals
Larry Junstrom - bass guitar
Gary Moffatt - drums
Donnie Van Zant - guitar, vocals

Production
Producer: Don Barnes, Danny Chauncey, Ben Fowler, 38 Special
Live production: Ken Botelho
Engineers: Allen Ditto, Ben Fowler, Edd Miller
Mixing: Ben Fowler, Edd Miller
Mastering: Glenn Meadows, Charlie Watts
Concept: Mark Weiss
Graphic design: Al Lehman, Mike McLaughlin, Richard Rodriguez
Art Direction: Mark Weiss
Digital Imaging: Al Lehman, Mike McLaughlin, Richard Rodriguez
Assistant: Amy Palyce
Photography: Mark Weiss

References

38 Special (band) albums
1999 live albums
CMC International live albums